Bill Zavatsky (born 1943 Bridgeport, Connecticut) is an American poet, journalist, jazz pianist, and translator. Zavatsky could be described as a second-generation New York School poet, influenced by such writers as Frank O'Hara and Kenneth Koch. (Koch was his professor at Columbia University.) In addition to the wry humor typical of the New York School, Zavatsky adds to his poetry an emotional poignancy that gives it additional depth.

Life

Zavatsky grew up in a working-class family in Bridgeport, Connecticut. His father was a mechanic who owned a garage. Zavatsky was the first member of his family to graduate from a four-year college. He attended Columbia University, where his fellow students included a dynamic cohort of budding writers, such as Phillip Lopate, Ron Padgett, and David Shapiro.

Career

Zavatsky's artistic influences include the jazz pianist Bill Evans, whom Zavatsky got to know late in the musician's career. Zavatsky has eloquently eulogized Evans, both in the liner notes to his albums, and in his poem "Live at the Village Vanguard."

Like some of his predecessors in the New York School, Zavatsky also excels as a translator of poetry. His work in this area has included English versions of the writers André Breton, Valery Larbaud, Robert Desnos, and Ramón Gómez de la Serna. His co-translation of André Breton's Earthlight received the PEN Translation Prize.

Zavatsky has worked as a journalist; his articles have appeared in The New York Times Book Review and Rolling Stone.  He was editor-in-chief of SUN press and SUN magazine.

He has taught workshops for Teachers & Writers Collaborative, Long Island University, and University of Texas-Austin For many years he taught English at Trinity School in New York City, where his students frequently won creative writing awards.

Zavatsky lives in New York City.

Awards

2008 Guggenheim Fellowship
1994 PEN/Book-of-the-Month Club Translation Prize

Works

'Roy Rogers:One line Poems' article- Winter Issue 1974. New York Hospitality House
"Up in Grandma’s Room", Poetry Magazine

Poetry
Theories of Rain and Other Poems, Sun, 1975, 
For Steve Royal and Other Poems, Coalition of Publishers for Employment, 1985
Where X Marks the Spot Hanging Loose Press, 2006,

Translations

The Poems of A.O. Barnabooth Valéry Larbaud, Translators Ron Padgett, Bill Zavatsky, Mushinsha, 1977
Earthlight: Poems of André Breton Translator Bill Zavatsky, Zack Rogow, Sun & Moon Press, 1993,

See also
Monostich

References

External links
Info on 'One line Poems '  article 1974
"Interview with Bill Zavatsky", Big Bridge, Dave Brinks
"Still Believe In The Rainbow", The Brooklyn Rail, John Yau
"Where X Marks The Spot by Bill Zavatsky" , Cold Front Magazine, Mike McDonough

Poets from Connecticut
Living people
1943 births
Writers from Bridgeport, Connecticut